The 2016 Racket Club Open was a professional tennis tournament played on clay courts. It was the first edition of the tournament which was part of the 2016 ATP Challenger Tour. It took place in Buenos Aires, Argentina between 11 and 17 January 2016.

Singles main-draw entrants

Seeds

 1 Rankings are as of January 4, 2016.

Other entrants
The following players received wildcards into the singles main draw:
  Gianni Mina
  Andrés Molteni
  Santiago Rodríguez Taverna
  Matias Zukas

The following players received entry from the qualifying draw:
  Maximiliano Estévez
  Martín Cuevas
  Agustín Velotti
  Franco Agamenone

The following players received entry as lucky losers:
 Hernán Casanova
 Peter Torebko

Champions

Singles

 Facundo Bagnis def.  Arthur De Greef 6–3, 6–2

Doubles

 Facundo Bagnis /  Máximo González def.  Sergio Galdós /  Christian Lindell 6–1, 6–2

External links

Racket Club Open